Alexander Seton may refer to:

 Alexander Seton (Governor of Berwick) (fl. 1311 – 1340) 
 Alexander Seton (d. 1332), nobleman
 Alexander Seton, Lord Gordon (died 1440)
 Alexander Seton, 1st Earl of Dunfermline (1555–1622)
 Alexander Seton, 1st Viscount of Kingston (1620–1691)
 Alexander Seaton (before 1626 – after 1649, also spelled Seton)
 Alexander Seton, 3rd Earl of Dunfermline (1642–1677), grandson of the 1st Earl
 Sir Alexander Seton, 1st Baronet (1639?–1719)
 Alexander Seton (priest) (died 1797), Archdeacon of Aghadoe